Sujan Singh was a story writer of Punjab, India.

Early life 

Singh was born on 29 July 1909, to father S. Hakim Singh, in Dera Baba Nanak, a town of Gurdaspur district in Indian Punjab. He was brought up by his maternal grandparents and spent his early childhood days in Calcutta. After his grandparents' and father's death, he had a difficult time.

He got his primary education from Bal Mukand Khatri Middle School and did his Bachelor of Arts from Khalsa College in Amritsar. He did his Giani (a course) and Master of Arts in Punjabi by corresponding.

He started working as a bank clerk. After some time he became a Punjabi teacher in Quetta, Pakistan. He also worked as a headmaster. Later he became a Punjabi lecturer. He was also a principal in Guru Nanak College, Gurdaspur.

He was known as a progressive writer. He regained President of Kendri Punjabi Lekhak Sabha, Senior vice president of Punjabi Sahitya Academy Ludhiana, member of presidium of progressive Writers Association of India and of Afro-Asian Writers Association.

He was married to Joginder Kaur. He had three sons and five daughters. Bawa Balwant, a noted Punjabi poet of Punjab was one of his close friends.

Career 

He had a deep understanding of human mind and social relations and he stood for the down trodden and deprived section of the society. Since he was acquainted to world literature, he attempted to write short stories which can be compared with the classical short stories of the world literature. He was associated with the progressive literary movement and its impact can be observed in his stories. He also attempted to retell the stories of Sikh gurus in his own way.

Although he is known for his stories, he wrote some essays too. His first essay, Tawian wala Waaja, was published in the monthly magazine Likhari. He published two collections of essays, Jammu Jee Tusi Barhe Raa and Khumban Da Shikar. His story anthologies include Dukh Sukh (1939), Dukh Sukh Ton Pichhon(1944), Dedh Aadmi, Manukh Te Pashu(1954), Kalgi Dian Annian(1969) and Shehar Te Garaan(1985).

Awards 

He was awarded the Sahitya Akademi Award by the Sahitya Akademi, India's National Academy of Letters, for his story collection, Shehar Te Garaan, in 1986. He was also awarded the Best story writer of Punjabi by the Language Department of Punjab in 1972. He also wrote three books on the lives of Sri Guru Nanak Dev ji (Wade Kian Wadiian), Guru Amar Dass ji (Amar Guru Rishman) and Guru Gobind Singh ji (Kalgi Dian Annian).

References 

Punjabi-language writers
Punjabi people
Indian Sikhs
1909 births
1993 deaths
People from Gurdaspur district
20th-century Indian short story writers
Recipients of the Sahitya Akademi Award in Punjabi
Writers from Punjab, India